Laetiporus is a genus of edible mushrooms found throughout much of the world. Some species, especially Laetiporus sulphureus, are commonly known as sulphur shelf, chicken of the woods, the chicken mushroom, or the chicken fungus because it is often described as tasting like and having a texture similar to that of chicken meat.  The name "chicken of the woods" is not to be confused with another edible polypore, Maitake (Grifola frondosa) known as "hen of the woods/rams head” or with Lyophyllum decastes, known as the "fried chicken mushroom". The name Laetiporus means "with bright pores".

Description
These shelves are made up of many tiny tubular filaments (hyphae). The mushroom grows in large brackets – some have been found that weigh over 45 kg (100 pounds). It is most commonly found on wounds of trees, mostly oak, though it is also frequently found on eucalyptus, yew,  sweet chestnut, and willow, as well as conifers in some species. Laetiporus species are parasitic and produce brown rot in the host on which they grow.

Young fruiting bodies are characterized by a moist, rubbery, sulphur-yellow to orange body sometimes with bright orange tips.  Older brackets become pale and brittle almost chalk-like, mildly pungent, and are often dotted with beetle or slug/woodlouse holes. Similar species include Laetiporus gilbertsonii (fluorescent pink, more amorphous) and L. coniferica (common in the western United States, especially on red fir trees).  Edibility traits for the different species have not been well documented, although all are generally considered edible with caution.

The sulphur shelf mushroom sometimes comes back year after year when the weather suits its sporulation preferences. From late spring to early autumn, the sulphur shelf thrives, making it a boon to mushroom hunters and a bane to those concerned about the health of their trees.  This fungus causes a brown cubical rot and embrittlement which in later stages ends in the collapse of the host tree, as it can no longer flex and bend in the wind.

Chicken of the woods is found growing on or at the base of dead or dying hardwood trees; most commonly on oak but also cherry or beech. It can also be found on dead conifer stumps. Chicken of the woods has been known to fruit on living trees as well. It typically grows from spring to early fall.

Phylogenetics

Phylogenetic analyses of ITS, nuclear large subunit and mitochondrial small subunit rDNA sequences from a variety of North American species have delineated five distinct clades within the core Laetiporus clade:
Conifericola clade: contains species that live on conifers, such as L. conifericola and L. huroniensis. All of the other tested species grow on angiosperms.
Cincinnatus clade: contains L. cincinnatus
Sulphureus clade I: contains white-pored L. sulphureus isolates.
Sulphureus clade II: contains yellow-pored L. sulphureus isolates.
Gilbertsonii clade: contains L. gilbertsonii and unidentified Caribbean isolates.

In addition, phylogenetic clades have been identified from Japan, Hawaii, South America, Europe, and South Africa.

Edibility
The mushroom can be prepared in most ways that one can prepare chicken meat. It can also be used as a substitute for chicken in a vegetarian diet. Additionally, it can be frozen for long periods of time and retain its edibility. In certain parts of Germany and North America, it is considered a delicacy.

In some cases eating the mushroom "causes mild reactions ... for example, "swollen lips" or in rare cases "nausea, vomiting, dizziness and disorientation" to those who are sensitive. This  is believed to be due to a number of factors that include allergies to the mushroom's protein or toxins which are only somewhat stable at high temperatures.  As such, many field guides  request that those who eat Laetiporus exercise caution by only eating fresh, young brackets and begin with small quantities to see how well it sits in their stomach.

Laetiporus sulphureus has a potent ability to inhibit staph bacteria (Staphylococcus aureus), as well as moderate ability to inhibit the growth of Bacillus subtilis.

Species
Laetiporus ailaoshanensis B.K.Cui & J.Song (2014)
Laetiporus baudonii  (Pat.) Ryvarden (1991)
Laetiporus caribensis  Banik & D.L.Lindner (2012)
Laetiporus cincinnatus  (Morgan) Burds., Banik & T.J.Volk (1998)
Laetiporus conifericola  Burds. & Banik (2001)
Laetiporus cremeiporus  Y.Ota & T.Hatt. (2010)
Laetiporus discolor  (Klotzsch) Corner (1984)
Laetiporus flos-musae  Overeem (1927)
Laetiporus gilbertsonii  Burds. (2001)
Laetiporus huroniensis  Burds. & Banik (2001)
Laetiporus miniatus  (P.Karst.) Overeem (1925)
Laetiporus montanus  Černý ex Tomšovský & Jankovský (2009)
Laetiporus persicinus  (Berk. & M.A.Curtis) Gilb. (1981)
Laetiporus portentosus  (Berk.) Rajchenb. (1995)
Laetiporus squalidus  R.M.Pires, Motato-Vásq. & Gugliotta (2016)
Laetiporus sulphureus  (Bull.) Murrill (1920)
Laetiporus versisporus   (Lloyd) Imazeki (1943) 
Laetiporus zonatus  B.K.Cui & J.Song (2014)

See also
 List of meat substitutes

References

External links

 Mushroom-Collecting.com - Laetiporus

 
Wood-decay fungi
Edible fungi
Meat substitutes
Polyporales genera
Taxa named by William Alphonso Murrill
Taxa described in 1904